Lake Bam is located near the town of Kongoussi, in Burkina Faso. The lake is slowly drying up, putting at risk the nearby village's agriculture, fish stocks, and cattle watering. The lake has been designated as a Ramsar site since 2009.

See also

References

Bam
Ramsar sites in Burkina Faso